Golden State Medium Community Correctional Facility is a privately owned medium-security prison for men, operated by the GEO Group under contract with the California Department of Corrections and Rehabilitation to house a maximum of 700 state inmates at medium security.   The facility stands in McFarland, Kern County, California.

References

Prisons in California
Buildings and structures in Kern County, California
GEO Group